Enneapterygius qirmiz is a species of triplefin blenny in the genus Enneapterygius. It was described by Wouter Holleman and Sergey V. Bogorodsky in 2012. This species is found in the Red Sea from Ras Mohammed in the Gulf of Aqaba to Yemen.

References

qirmiz
Taxa named by Wouter Holleman
Taxa named by Sergey V. Bogorodsky
Fish described in 2012